Steve Johnson was the defending champion, but lost to Donald Young in the first round.
Bradley Klahn won the title over Dan Evans 3–6, 7–6(7–5), 6–4

Seeds

Main draw

Finals

Top half

Bottom half

References 
 Main draw
 Qualifying draw

Comerica Bank Challenger - Men's Singles
2013 Men's Singles